The 2012 Avispa Fukuoka season sees Avispa Fukuoka return to J.League Division 2 after spending 2011 in J1. This is their non-consecutive 13th season in the second tier since 1991. Avispa Fukuoka are also competing in the 2012 Emperor's Cup.

Players

Competitions

J.League

League table

Matches

Emperor's Cup

References

Avispa Fukuoka
Avispa Fukuoka seasons